Events in the year 1951 in Portugal.

Incumbents
President: Oscar Carmona (until 18 April), António de Oliveira Salazar (18 April-21 July) Francisco Craveiro Lopes (from 21 July)
Prime Minister: António de Oliveira Salazar

Events
 22 July - Presidential election.

Arts and entertainment

Sports
8 February – F.C. Penafiel founded 
Establishment of the Portuguese Handball First Division
Real Sport Clube founded

Births
6 June – Manuel Fernandes, football player and coach.
27 June – Manuel Cajuda, football manager.

Deaths

18 April – Óscar Carmona, president (born 1869)
25 October (in France) – Amélie of Orléans, Queen consort of Portugal

References

 
1950s in Portugal
Portugal
Years of the 20th century in Portugal
Portugal